Rachaf or Rchaf is a village in the Bint Jbeil District of the Nabatieh Governorate of Southern Lebanon, 16 kilometres from the Israel-Lebanon border.

Etymology 
According to Palmer, the name means "morass" or "bog.

Location 
Rachaf is situated 106 km from Beirut, on a hill overlooking Srobbine and Debel villages. It covers an area of 608 hectares and is located 750m above sea level. The following villages border Rachaf : Srobbine - Debel - Al Tiri - Haddatha - Beit Leif. It can be reached by several routes, such as the following :
Sour - Aain Baal - Qana - Siddiqine - Kafra - Hariss - Haddatha - Rachaf

History
In 1596, it was named as a village, ar-Rasaf, in the Ottoman nahiya (subdistrict) of Tibnin under the liwa' (district) of Safad, with a population of 51 households, all Muslim. The villagers paid a fixed tax rate of 25% on agricultural products, such as wheat, barley, fruit trees, goats and beehives, in addition to "occasional revenues"; a total of 2,720 akçe.

In 1881, the PEF's Survey of Western Palestine (SWP) described it: "A stone village, containing about 100 Metawileh, situated on a hill-top, with a few grapes, figs and olives, and arable cultivation; there is a spring near and cisterns in the village; also a birket for cattle.”

Following the 1982 invasion Rachaf became part of the Israeli ‘security zone’. On 29th September 1992, following 5 days of clashes between Hizbullah and the South Lebanon Army, Hizbullah attacked the SLA position in Rachaf with Katyusha rockets. In the ensuing battle 2 SLA and 4 Hizbullah men were killed.

Population 
The registered population is estimated at 3,200 people. During the winter, the number of residents is approximately 300, a number which increases to 1,500 during summer. The low number of residents is because Rachaf was under Israeli occupation, which forced most of the residents to immigrate to the southern suburbs of Beirut and Sour, Aaitit, Al Rmadiyeh, Al Sarafand and Al Bazouriyeh. Despite the Israeli retreat in year 2000, migrants did not return to their village. However, the village has witnessed some renewed construction activities, with 200 additional houses built. There are 250 houses in the village distributed across 12 quarters: El Dayaa - Al Saha, Al Bayyad, Khalet El Maghara, Sahlet El Zaitoun, Al Roués, Al Dabsh Al Sharky, Al Dabsh Al Gharby, Al Assi, Al Maabour, Aain Jdeidah, Al Sowan, and Al Aaqaba.

Voters 
The number of registered voters May 2004 was 1,690 (832 males and 858 females) compared to 1,505 voters in 2000, distributed mainly between 24 families.

Local Authorities 
The village has a municipal council composed of 12 members. It was recently founded, based on the decision of the Minister of Interior and Municipalities no. 8 dated January 13, 2004. Rachaf has two mayors, one residing in the village and the other residing in Beirut southern suburb. The revenues that the municipality received from the independent municipal council in 2002 stood at LBP 115 million.

Educational and social institutions 
The village has one primary public school with 26 registered students as of October 2004 - 9 in kindergarten and 17 in primary cycle. The school has 5 teachers. The total number of students in Rachaf is about 50, most of them registered in schools in Kafra and Bint Jbeil.

Economic Activities 
The cultivated area constitutes only 5.6% of total land, while the arable land reaches 37% of the total area. The main products cultivated are olives, grains and tobacco. The Lebanese Reggie for Tobacco and Tombacs buys the entire tobacco production of the 22 farmers in the village. Oil, grains and other agricultural goods (tomatoes, cantaloupes, etc.) produced are sold in the village. Moreover, the production of honey is estimated at 500 kg, which is sold inside the village at LBP 20,000-30,000/kilo.

Problems 
The major problem in Rachaf is the emigration to other towns and cities. Furthermore, the village lacks a sewage system, which forces the residents to use cesspools. The poor health services due to the lack of dispensaries in the village forces the villagers to go to the dispensaries and hospitals located outside the village such as Tebnin Governmental Hospital (8 km away) or Salah Ghandour Hospital (7 km away).

References

Bibliography

External links
Survey of Western Palestine, Map 4: IAA, Wikimedia commons
Rachaf, Localiban 

Populated places in Bint Jbeil District